María Cecilia Rognoni (born December 1, 1976 in Buenos Aires) is a retired Argentine field hockey player, who won the 2002 World Cup in Perth, Australia where she was elected as the best woman hockey player in the world by the FIH.  She is currently playing in the Dutch team HC Bloemendaal in the second division of the Netherlands.

Cecilia belongs to the generation that gave rise to the myth of the Las Leonas. She won the silver medal at the 2000 Summer Olympics in Sydney, the bronze medal at the 2004 Summer Olympics in Athens and the Champions Trophy in 2001. In 2005, she was separated from the Argentine national field hockey team by the coach Gabriel Minadeo, after she said that "many of the players have a place on the team just because of their surname".  She came back to the team in 2010  under Carlos Retegui coaching but was forced to leave the team due knee injuries.

She  also played for Club Ciudad de Buenos Aires and HC Rotterdam in the Netherlands.

Honours
 1994: Champion of the South American Tournament (Chile)
 1995: 4th place at the Olympic Qualifying Tournament (Cape Town)
 1996: 7th place at the 1996 Summer Olympics
 1997: 3rd place at the Junior World Championships (Korea)
 1998: 4th place at the World Championship (Ultrecht, Netherlands)
 1999: Gold medal at the 1999 Pan American Games (Winnipeg, Canada)
 1999: 4th place in the Champions Trophy (Brisbane)
 2000: Silver Medal at the 2000 Summer Olympics
 2001: Pan American Cup (Kingston, Jamaica)
 2001: Champions Trophy (Amstelveen, Netherlands)
 2001: Champion of the Three Nations Cup
 2002: 2nd place at the Champions Trophy (Macau, China)
 2002: World Cup (Perth, Australia)
 2003: Champion of the Euro with the Rotterdam (Netherlands)
 2003: 2003 Pan American Games (Santo Domingo, Dominican Republic)
 2004: 2nd place four nations tournament Córdoba (Argentina)
 2004: Bronze medal at the 2004 Summer Olympics
 2004: 3rd place at the Champions Trophy (Rosario, Argentina)

Individual
 1995 - Clarín Award Revelation (Field Hockey)
 1997 - Top scorer in the junior Pan American Championship in Chile
 1998 - Clarín Award Consecration (Field Hockey)
 2000 - Gold Olimpia Award (Field Hockey) (National Team)
 2001 - Pan American Cup scorer of Kingston, Jamaica
 2002 - Best player of the tournament (Champions Trophy in Macau, China)
 2002 - FIH Player of the Year Award
 2002 - Clarín Award Consecration (Field Hockey)
 2002 - Olimpia Award (Field Hockey)
 2002 - Gold Olimpia Award (Best Athlete of the Year)

References
Portions based on a translation from Spanish Wikipedia

External links
 
  sports-reference
 Website with more information 

1976 births
Living people
Argentine female field hockey players
Olympic field hockey players of Argentina
Field hockey players at the 1996 Summer Olympics
Field hockey players at the 2000 Summer Olympics
Field hockey players at the 2004 Summer Olympics
Olympic silver medalists for Argentina
Olympic bronze medalists for Argentina
Argentine people of Italian descent
Field hockey players from Buenos Aires
Place of birth missing (living people)
Las Leonas players
Olympic medalists in field hockey
Medalists at the 2004 Summer Olympics
Medalists at the 2000 Summer Olympics
Pan American Games gold medalists for Argentina
Pan American Games medalists in field hockey
HC Bloemendaal players
Field hockey players at the 1999 Pan American Games
Field hockey players at the 2003 Pan American Games
HC Rotterdam players
Medalists at the 1999 Pan American Games
Medalists at the 2003 Pan American Games
21st-century Argentine women